Al-Nasafi may refer to:
Muhammad al-Nasafi (d. 943), Isma'ili missionary
Abul-Mu'in Maymun al-Nasafi, 10th/11th-century Muslim scholar
Abu Hafs Umar al-Nasafi, 10th/11th-century Muslim scholar (d. 1142)
ʻAziz Nasafi (Aziz ad-Din ibn Muhammad al-Nasafi, also Azizuddin Nasafi), 13th-century Persian Sufi. Studied by E. H. Palmer and others.
Burhanuddin Mohammad al-Nasafi, 13th-century Muslim scholar
Abu al-Barakat al-Nasafi, 14th-century Muslim scholar